Sabalo may refer to:

Sabalo, also called sábalo, various species of fish
USS Sabalo, the name of more than one United States Navy ship